Heaven Shall Burn is a German extreme metal band from Saalfeld, formed in 1995. The band consists of vocalist Marcus Bischoff, guitarists Maik Weichert and Alexander Dietz, bassist Eric Bischoff and drummer Christian Bass. They are currently signed to Century Media. They have released eight studio albums, as well as a number of other records. One of their albums, Veto, entered the German album charts at number 2 in 2013, with their latest, Of Truth and Sacrifice, reaching number 1.

Heaven Shall Burn's musical style has been described as metalcore, melodic death metal and deathcore. Their lyrics often express heavy support for anti-racism and anti-fascism. They also have lyrics about resistance, oppression and animal rights. All members are vegans or vegetarians and most follow or followed a straight edge lifestyle.

History

Formation and first releases (1995–1999) 
Heaven Shall Burn was formed by guitarist Maik Weichert and drummer Matthias Voigt in May 1995 under the name Before The Fall. After performing a couple of shows, the band renamed to Consense and recorded their first demo, titled The Eve of the Storm, in winter 1997. In early 1998, cousins Marcus and Eric Bischoff joined the band as vocalist and bassist, respectively. With this lineup, Consense recorded a second demo, which led to a contract with Deeds of Revolution Records. The band began the recording of their debut EP In Battle... in summer 1998, but decided on renaming for a second time to Heaven Shall Burn before the EP's release. The EP was released through Deeds of Revolution Records in late 1998, and a split album with label mates Fall of Serenity was released in 1999. Around this time, Michael Hartmann left the band and Patrick Schleitzer filled in his position as second guitarist.

Asunder, The Split Program and Whatever It May Take (2000–2003) 
After their shared released with Fall of Serenity they signed to Lifeforce Records. Lifeforce released Heaven Shall Burn's debut album Asunder and their first collaboration with Caliban, titled The Split Program, in 2000. Heaven Shall Burn proceeded to tour in Europe and South America. In 2002, Heaven Shall Burn released their second album Whatever It May Take and a re-issue of the In Battle... EP. In support of the album, the band embarked on another tour cycle, which led them through numerous countries, including Greece, Iceland and the UK. They also played prestigious German festivals such as Party.San, With Full Force and Wacken Open Air.

Antigone and Deaf to Our Prayers (2004–2006) 

After signing to Century Media in January 2004, Heaven Shall Burn's label debut Antigone was released on 26 April. The LP version of the album was released through Lifeforce. Shortly after the release of Antigone Heaven Shall Burn filmed a music video for the song "The Weapon They Fear". Antigone was further promoted during a headlining tour through Europe, supported by Maroon. On this tour they appeared at the hardcore punk festival Fluff Fest for the third and thus final time.

After the 2004 Indian Ocean tsunami, Heaven Shall Burn teamed up with Napalm Death and the Haunted and released the split single Tsunami Benefit to raise money for charity. The single was limited to 1,000 hand-numbered copies and was sold on two exclusive Napalm Death shows.

In March 2005, Heaven Shall Burn appeared at the Independence D Festival in Japan. In summer 2005 Heaven Shall Burn and Caliban's second split album The Split Program II was released through Lifeforce Records. Shortly after participating at the Hell on Earth Tour 2005 Heaven Shall Burn announced that guitarist Patrick Schleitzer was leaving the band and Alexander Dietz, who played the guitar during the Hell on Earth Tour, would become the new guitarist. Heaven Shall Burn played a special farewell show with Schleitzer in Saalfeld.

Following a quiet period, Heaven Shall Burn announced they had recorded a new album titled Deaf to Our Prayers, which was released on 28 August 2006. After the release of "Counterweight", as the first track of the new album, Deaf to Our Prayers entered the German album charts at #65, being the first Heaven Shall Burn album to enter record sales charts. During Summer 2006, Heaven Shall Burn played shows at Summer Breeze Open Air and other festivals. Live footage, recorded at Summer Breeze was later used in the "Counterweight" music video. In September and October they headlined the Hell on Earth Tour 2006 on the European mainland, also part of the tour were Cataract, Maroon, and God Forbid. At the end of the year they embarked co-headlining tour with Caliban through Germany and Belgium.

Iconoclast trilogy (2007–2012) 
A re-mixed version of Whatever It May Take was released in 2007, featuring a different song order and an acoustic track "io". For the shows during the summer Christian Bass was hired as live drummer. In August Heaven Shall Burn announced they had begun recording a new album. In October the new album Iconoclast (Part 1: The Final Resistance) was announced, with release dates in early 2008. Heaven Shall Burn finished the year 2007, participating in the Darkness Over X-Mas Tour, co-headlining with Caliban, with support of Sonic Syndicate, Misery Speaks and the Sorrow. "Endzeit", the first song released of Iconoclast, saw its live premiere on that tour.

After its release Iconoclast entered the German album charts at #21, Heaven Shall Burn's best charting position to that date. Also a music video was released for the track "Endzeit". Shortly after a couple release shows in Germany and Greece, Heaven Shall Burn went on tour in support of Iconoclast. The first leg of the tour through Europe was joined by Aborted and Misery Speaks, the second leg of the tour was Heaven Shall Burn's first ever North American tour with support of Embrace the End and the Ghost Inside. The North American leg was a brief tour across the US and Canada winding up at the New England Metal and Hardcore Festival. Following their North American tour Heaven Shall Burn played several summer festival across Europe. In Vienna, Heaven Shall Burn played a show to celebrated their 10th Anniversary. The show was recorded for a future DVD.

The recording of the Vienna show was released as part of Bildersturm – Iconoclast II (The Visual Resistance). Heaven Shall Burn's first DVD Bildersturm was released in 2009. With its release a music video for Heaven Shall Burn's Edge of Sanity cover of "Black Tears" came along. In May Heaven Shall Burn supported Trivium on their Australian tour. Again in summer Heaven Shall Burn appeared on festivals across Europe including Wacken Open Air. In early December Heaven Shall Burn were special guest on the Taste of Chaos 2009 tour dates in Germany, headlined by In Flames and Killswitch Engage. Later in December Heaven Shall Burn embarked the Darkness Over X-Mas Tour with support of Dark Tranquillity, Swashbuckle, and Deadlock.

The third part of the Iconoclast trilogy Invictus (Iconoclast III) was released in May 2010 and became the band's and Century Media's first release to enter the top ten of the German Album Charts, entering at #9. To further promote Invictus Heaven Shall Burn embarked a co-headlining tour with As I Lay Dying through Europe, in November 2010, with support of Suicide Silence and Dew-Scented. In May 2011, Heaven Shall Burn toured across South America, again with As I Lay Dying.

In early 2012, Heaven Shall Burn were part of the Australian Soundwave Festival and played shows in South-East Asia. After that they took part at the Impericon Progression Tour, the tour line-up included Unearth, Neaera and Suffokate on the European mainland and Rise to Remain, Malefice and Adept in the UK. After numerous festival shows, including a headlining show at With Full Force, Heaven Shall Burn and Caliban joined forces to celebrate either band's 15th Anniversary. Heaven Shall Burn celebrated their 15th Anniversary playing their 500th show on 21 December 2012 in the sold out Klubhaus in their hometown Saalfeld.

Veto (2013–2015) 

In January 2013, Heaven Shall Burn announced they had finished writing their next album and were about to start recording it. On 20 February they revealed their new album Veto, which was released 19 April, in Germany and 30 April, in North America. To promote the album's release a music video was shot for "Hunters Will Be Hunted" and a lyric video was made for "Godiva". The release of the album was celebrated with shows at the Impericon Festivals in Leipzig and Vienna and the Loudfest in Zurich. Veto entered the official German Album Charts at #2. Heaven Shall Burn appeared on some European Summer Festivals in 2013, among these festivals were Graspop Metal Meeting and the first edition of Rock'n'Heim at the Hockenheimring. In support of Veto Heaven Shall burn embarked a headlining tour through Europe in November and December 2013, supporting acts were Hypocrisy, Dying Fetus and Bleed from Within. Before the tour began drummer Matthias Voigt released a statement and announced that he was about to step down as drummer of Heaven Shall Burn and live drummer Christian Bass would take his position.

In February 2014, Heaven Shall Burn toured South America with Parkway Drive. Heaven Shall Burn played several festivals across Europe in the Summer of 2014 including Rock am Ring and Rock im Park, Wacken Open Air, Deichbrand and Summer Breeze Open Air. Later the same year Heaven Shall Burn were special guest on Parkway Drive's European Tour 2014, along with Carnifex and Northlane. Parkway Drive shared headlining duties with Heaven Shall Burn in Germany, Austria and Switzerland.

On 30 April 2015, Heaven Shall Burn became the sponsor for the tricots of football team FC Carl Zeiss Jena. It is part of their campaign "Support Your Local Team", which should encourage people to support their local clubs, not only top class clubs. 3 May, was the first time Jena played in their new tricots.

As many summers before Heaven Shall Burn appeared on various European festivals during summer 2015, including Greenfield Festival, With Full Force, Resurrection Fest and Brutal Assault.

Wanderer (2016–2019) 

On 16 September 2016, the band released their eighth studio album, Wanderer, available in a standard 12-track edition as well as a deluxe edition with a bonus track and a bonus disc (which contains covers included on previous albums). The first single released from the album was "Downshifter", followed by "Bring the War Home", which was released as a lyric video.

Of Truth and Sacrifice (2020–present) 
On 20 March 2020, the band released their ninth studio album, Of Truth and Sacrifice. It was released as a double album, available in the standard 2-CD as well as a deluxe edition with a bonus DVD, which contains the movie "Mein grünes Herz in dunklen Zeiten" (My green heart in dark times). The first single released from the album was the double release of "Protector" and "Weakness leaving my heart", which was released as a music video. It was followed by "My Heart and the Ocean", which was also released with a music video made in cooperation with Sea Shepherd.

Band name 
Heaven Shall Burn's name was inspired by an album by the black metal band Marduk, which is entitled Heaven Shall Burn... When We Are Gathered.

Members 

Current
 Maik Weichert – guitars 
 Marcus Bischoff – vocals 
 Eric Bischoff – bass 
 Alexander Dietz – guitars 
 Christian Bass – drums 

Former
 Michael Hartmann – guitars 
 Patrick Schleitzer – guitars 
 Matthias Voigt – drums 

Session musicians
 Daniel Wilding – drums

Timeline

Discography 

Studio albums
 Asunder (2000)
 Whatever It May Take (2002)
 Antigone (2004)
 Deaf to Our Prayers (2006)
 Iconoclast (Part 1: The Final Resistance) (2008)
 Invictus (Iconoclast III) (2010)
 Veto (2013)
 Wanderer (2016)
 Of Truth and Sacrifice (2020)

References

External links 

 
 
 

1995 establishments in Germany
Century Media Records artists
Abacus Recordings artists
Deathcore musical groups
German melodic death metal musical groups
German metalcore musical groups
Musical groups established in 1995
Musical quintets